Alia is a genus of small sea snails, marine gastropod mollusks in the family Columbellidae, the dove snails.

Species
According to the World Register of Marine Species (WoRMS), the following species with a valid name are included within the genus Alia :
 Alia carinata (Hinds, 1844)
 Alia unicolor (G. B. Sowerby I, 1832)
 Alia unifasciata (G.B. Sowerby, 1832)
 Species brought into synonymy
 Alia aurantiaca (Dall, 1871): synonym of Mitrella aurantiaca (Dall, 1871)
 Alia callimorpha]' Dall, 1919: synonym of Alia carinata (Hinds, 1844)
 Alia casciana Dall, 1919: synonym of Alia gausapata (Gould, 1850)
 Alia gausapata (Gould, 1850): synonym of Mitrella gausapata (Gould, 1850)
 Alia gouldi (Carpenter, 1856): synonym of Alia carinata (Hinds, 1844)
 Alia permodesta (Dall, 1890): synonym of Astyris permodesta (Dall, 1890)
 Alia tuberosa (Carpenter, 1865): synonym of Mitrella tuberosa (Carpenter, 1865)
 Alia xenia Dall, 1919: synonym of Mitrella xenia'' (Dall, 1919)

References

External links
 GBIF info at: 
 Adams H. & Adams A. (1853-1858). The genera of Recent Mollusca; arranged according to their organization. London, van Voorst. Vol. 1: xl + 484 pp.; vol. 2: 661 pp.; vol. 3: 138 pls. [Published in parts: Vol. 1: i-xl (1858), 1-256 (1853), 257-484 (1854). Vol. 2: 1-92 (1854), 93-284 (1855), 285-412 (1856), 413-540 (1857), 541-661 (1858). Vol. 3: pl. 1-32 (1853), 33-96 (1855), 97-112 (1856), 113-128 (1857), 129-138 (1858) 

Columbellidae
Gastropod genera